Aponoea pruinosella is a moth in the family Gelechiidae. It was described by Pierre Chrétien in 1915. It is found in Algeria.

The wingspan is 11-12.5 mm.

References

Moths described in 1915
Chelariini
Moths of Africa